Saint Mary's Academy and College is a religious school of the Society of St. Pius X located in St. Marys, Kansas.

The original St. Mary's College 
The original college at this location, St. Mary's College, was founded by the Jesuits in 1848 as an Indian mission. The school is the site of the first cathedral west of the Missouri River and east of the Rockies, the 1851 "log cathedral" of Bishop John Baptist Miège, S.J., Apostolic Vicar of Kansas under Pope Pius IX known familiarly as "The Bishop East of the Rockies".

When the Potawatomi left, the Jesuits turned it into a boarding school for boys, until it closed during the depression. After 1931 the 465 acre (1.9 km²) plot hosted the divinity school of St. Louis University. With the movement of seminaries to the city after Vatican II, the land was sold and the Jesuit divinity school returned to St. Louis in 1967.

Athletics 
The St. Mary's athletic teams were called the Knights. The college was a member of the National Association of Intercollegiate Athletics (NAIA), primarily competing in the Kansas Collegiate Athletic Conference (KCAC) from 1902–03 to 1930–31, the season where the school closed.

Saint Mary's Academy and College 
In 1978, the Society of Saint Pius X acquired the property along with 12 major buildings. The school is now incorporated in Kansas as The Society of Saint Pius X, Saint Mary's, Inc. It has no ties with the previous St. Marys College.

As of 2014, the Academy had an enrollment of over 800 students K-12 and the two-year college had an enrollment above 90 in a liberal arts curriculum.  St. Mary's does not have a seminary program. St Mary's offers boarding for students in the 8th grade and higher.

In 2002, the governor of Kansas formally recognized Saint Mary's Academy and College for the excellence of its educational curriculum.  While neither the Academy nor the College are accredited by any accreditation agencies, they do operate with approval from the Kansas Board of Regents.

The school operates its own radio station, KSMK-LP 98.3 FM, since 2002.

The Academy teams play in the Kansas Christian League in football and soccer and against some non-league teams.

St. Mary's Academy and College is also a SSPX parish of approximately 4,300 persons (2014).

In 2019, St. Mary's Academy and College announced plans for the construction of a new Immaculata Church, expected to hold 1500 people and to be the largest SSPX church in Kansas. https://discover.anewimmaculata.org

Controversy 
In February 2008, St. Mary's Academy made news when a female referee was told that she could not officiate at the high school basketball game. The other referee allegedly claimed that someone told him it was because she "could not be put in a position of authority over boys because of the academy's beliefs". The Academy denied this "belief".  St. Mary's Academy was removed from the Kansas State High School Activities Association list of approved schools.  They were reinstated two years later.

St. Mary's official reply to the incident was in a press release:

 This alleged reason was neither stated nor is it held by any official of St. Mary's Academy, as evidenced by the fact that the faculty and staff of St. Mary's includes many honorable ladies of talent and erudition....
 St. Mary's Academy follows the directives of the Catholic Church regarding co-education. The Church has always promoted the ideal of forming and educating boys and girls separately during the adolescent years, especially in physical education (Cf. Divini Illius Magistri - Encyclical on the Christian Education of Youth, by Pope Pius XI, 1929 and The Instruction of the Sacred Congregation of Religious on Co-Education, A.A.S., 25 (1958) pp. 99-103). This formation of adolescent boys is best accomplished by male role models, as the formation of girls is best accomplished by women. Hence in boys' athletic competitions, it is important that the various role models (coaches and referees) be men.

In 2004, the school forfeited a football game against White City High School because the opponent had a girl on the team.

Notable people
Alumni
 Robert Casey (1890–1962), combat veteran, newspaper correspondent and columnist for Chicago Daily News.
 Charles Comiskey (1859–1931), baseball player, manager, team owner.  He was the founding owner of the Chicago White Sox.  Comiskey Park was named for him.
Faculty
 Ernest Quigley (1880–1960), basketball referee, umpire in Major League Baseball, football coach at Kansas Wesleyan University.  At St. Mary's College, he was coach, teacher, athletic director from 1903 to 1912.

References

External links 
 
 KSMK school radio station

Buildings and structures of the Society of Saint Pius X
Educational institutions established in 1978
Main
Education in Pottawatomie County, Kansas
Education in Wabaunsee County, Kansas
Catholic universities and colleges in Kansas
Roman Catholic Archdiocese of Kansas City in Kansas
1978 establishments in Kansas